is a Japanese professional baseball pitcher for the Fukuoka SoftBank Hawks of the Nippon Professional Baseball (NPB).

Professional career
On October 26, 2017, Takahashi was drafted by the Fukuoka Softbank Hawks in the 2017 Nippon Professional Baseball draft.

On April 22, 2018, Takahashi pitched his debut game against the Hokkaido Nippon-Ham Fighters as a starting pitcher. In 2018 season, he finished the regular season with a 12 Games pitched, a 0–1 Win–loss record, a 3.00 ERA, a 15 strikeouts in 30 innings. And he pitched against the Hiroshima Toyo Carp as a relief pitcher in the 2018 Japan Series.

On March 31, 2019, Takahashi won the game for the first time in the Pacific League. Through 2019, he was 12-6 with two saves and a 3.34 ERA in 62 games (3 starts). On October 20, he pitched against the Yomiuri Giants as a starting pitcher, and won the game for the first time in the Japan Series. And he was honored with the 2019 Japan Series Excellent Player Award. On November 26, Takahashi was honored with the 2019 Pacific League Rookie of the Year Award and 2019 Pacific League Speed Up Award in NPB AWARDS 2019.

In 2020 season, Takahashi hurt his left thigh during spring training. As a result, he pitched as a relief pitcher in the 2020 season and finished the regular season with a 52 Games pitched, a 4–2 Win–loss record, a 2.65 ERA, a 23 Holds, a 29 strikeouts in 51 innings. In the 2020 Japan Series against the Yomiuri Giants, He pitched in Game 2 and Game 4 as a relief pitcher, with no hits no runs in both games and a Hold in Game 4 to contribute to the team's fourth consecutive Japan Series champion.

In 2021, takahashi finished the regular season with 11 Games pitched, a 1–1 Win–loss record, a 5.82 ERA, a 14 strikeouts in 34 innings.

In 2022, he pitched only 4 Games, a 0–0 Win–loss record, a 13.50 ERA, a 2 strikeouts in 3.1 innings.

International career 
Takahashi represented the Japan national baseball team in the 2015 Summer Universiade, 2018 MLB Japan All-Star Series, 2019 exhibition games against Mexico, and 2019 WBSC Premier12 tournament.

On October 18, 2018, he was selected at the 2018 MLB Japan All-Star Series.

On October 1, 2019, he was selected at the 2019 WBSC Premier12. He led the tournament in groundouts induced, with 21.

Pitching style

Takahashi is a tall pitcher and he has a style of delivery that transitions from starting at windup position with his baseball glove raised above the head to finishing submarine with a low release point.

He throws a fastball of over 140 km/h (87 mph) (tops out at 146 km/h, 90.7 mph) unusual for submarine pitchers.

And he throws a curveball, a sinker and a slider.

His pitching style is called Reiwa no Submarine (令和のサブマリン). 
Reiwa is  the current era of Japan.

References

External links

Career statistics - NPB.jp
28 Rei Takahashi PLAYERS2022 - Fukuoka SoftBank Hawks Official site

1995 births
Living people
Baseball people from Chiba Prefecture
Fukuoka SoftBank Hawks players
Japanese baseball players
Nippon Professional Baseball pitchers
2019 WBSC Premier12 players
Nippon Professional Baseball Rookie of the Year Award winners